Sasolburg Regiment was a light infantry regiment of the South African Army. It formed part of the South African Army Infantry Formation as well as the South African Territorial Reserve.

History

Origin
This unit was originally part of the Heilbron Commando before forming the Sasolburg Commando in February 1962.

Operations

With the SADF
Where the SASOL Commando was responsible for the SASOL and NATREF refineries, the Sasolburg Commando was responsible for all other factories and installations in the larger district.

The development of industries such as the African Explosives and Chemical Industries (AECI) and Karbochem increased the responsibility on the Sasolburg Commando as workers of these industries with Citizen Force Camp requirements were also transferred to the Sasolburg Commando.

From Commando to Regiment
The Sasolburg Commando was reclassified as a regiment in June 1985, even though its expanded responsibilities had existed since 4 February 1985. This new Regiment exercised its Freedom of Entry into Sasolburg for the first time on 25 October 1986.

The counter-insurgency battalion
In 1986 a decision was made that the Regiment would also be reclassed as a counter insurgency battalion and meant that it could be utilised in the black townships for riot control as well.

Command
The unit was initially under the command of Group 17 but was transferred to Group 42 in 1991, so that several units could be merged and be used in the greater Witwatersrand.

With the SANDF

Disbandment
This unit, along with all other Commando units was disbanded after a decision by South African President Thabo Mbeki to disband all Commando Units. The Commando system was phased out between 2003 and 2008 "because of the role it played in the apartheid era", according to the Minister of Safety and Security Charles Nqakula.

Leadership 

 

last OC Sasolburg Commando, first OC Regiment Sasolburg.

Unit Insignia

References

See also 
 South African Commando System

Infantry regiments of South Africa
Sasolburg
South African Commando Units
Military units and formations established in 1962